Lázaro Cárdenas Park is a park in Puerto Vallarta's Zona Romántica, in the Mexican state of Jalisco, located on the west coast of the country. 

A statue of Lázaro Cárdenas and the sculpture Ándale Bernardo are installed in the park.

Natasha Moraga is completing an art project called Tile Park.

References

External links

 
 TileParkPV.com

Parks in Jalisco
Zona Romántica